Elmwood Cemetery is the oldest active cemetery in Memphis, Tennessee. It was established in 1852 as one of the first rural cemeteries in the South.

A funeral scene in Paramount's 1993 legal thriller The Firm was filmed here.

Origins
Elmwood Cemetery was established as part of the Rural Cemetery Movement of the early-to-mid-19th century.  A classic example of a garden cemetery, it is notable for its park-like setting, sweeping vistas, shady knolls, large stands of ancient trees, and magnificent monuments.

On 28 August 1852, fifty prominent Memphis citizens each contributed $500 for stock certificates in order to purchase  of land for the cemetery; they envisioned that this land would be a park for the living as well as the dead, where family outings, picnics, and social gatherings could occur. It was meant to be a place where beautiful gardens were tended and individual monuments celebrated both life and death. The name for the place was chosen in a drawing: several proposed names were put into a hat and Elmwood was drawn, with the stockholders stating they were "well pleased" with the selection. Ironically, they had to hurriedly order some elms trees from New York to place among the native oaks of Memphis, since there were no elms in the area. In the 1870s, the original corporation controlling the cemetery was dissolved and it became one of the oldest nonprofits in Tennessee.

The first burial occurred on 15 July 1853, when Mrs. R.B. Berry was laid to rest.  Since then, more than 75,000 people have been buried at Elmwood Cemetery, with space still remaining for about 15,000 more.  The cemetery's gardens include the Carlisle S. Page Arboretum.  Beneath the cemetery's ancient elms, oaks, and magnolias lie some of the city's most honored and revered dead; flowering dogwoods and crepe myrtles are interspersed with Memphis history, those famous and infamous, loved and feared.  There are veterans of every American war, from the American Revolution up to the Vietnam War, and there are people from every walk of life and culture, including Mayors of Memphis, Governors of Tennessee, U.S. Senators, madams, blues singers, suffragists, martyrs, generals, civil rights leaders, holy men and women, outlaws and millionaires and ordinary citizens.

Civil War burials

About 1,000 Confederate soldiers and veterans are buried in Confederate Soldiers Rest, located in the cemetery's Fowler Section. Many other Confederates are buried elsewhere in the cemetery. The first burial in Confederate Soldiers Rest was William (Thomas) Gallagher on June 17, 1861, and the last interment was John Frank Gunter on April 1, 1940. Among the Confederate generals buried there are James Patton Anderson, a former U.S. Congressman who commanded the Army of Tennessee in 1862, Colton Greene, Preston Smith and William Henry Carroll.  Other burials include Isham G. Harris, Tennessee's Confederate-era governor, Thomas Battle Turley, CSA private and U.S. Senator from Tennessee, and William Graham Swan, a Confederate congressman and mayor of Knoxville.

Union soldiers also were buried at Elmwood in the 1860s, but almost all were removed in 1868 and reinterred in Memphis National Cemetery. Two Union generals, William Jay Smith and Milton T. Williamson, remain at Elmwood.

Also interred at Elmwood is renowned Civil War author Shelby Foote, famous for his comprehensive three volume, 3000-page history of the war The Civil War: A Narrative. He is buried beside the family plot of Confederate General Nathan Bedford Forrest. Forrest himself was also originally buried at Elmwood, but in 1904 the remains of Forrest and his wife Mary were disinterred and moved to a Memphis city park originally named Forrest Park in his honor, that has since been renamed Health Sciences Park.

Yellow Fever burials

There were several outbreaks of yellow fever in Memphis during the 1870s, the worst outbreak occurring in 1878, with over 5,000 fatalities in the city itself and 20,000 along the whole of the Mississippi River Valley. Some 2,500 of the Memphis victims are buried in four public lots at Elmwood; among them are doctors, ministers, nuns, travelers, and even sex workers who died while tending to the sick.

Notable people buried at Elmwood
 Finis L. Bates, Author
 Thea Bowman, Roman Catholic religious leader
 Robert Reed Church, businessman
 E. H. Crump, politician
 Shelby Foote, novelist, historian
 George Gordon, Confederate Army General
 Napoleon Hill, businessman
 Benjamin Hooks, American civil rights leader
 Wayne Jackson, musician
 James C. Jones, 10th TN Governor & TN Senator
 Estes W. Mann, prominent Memphis architect
 Maxine Smith, civil rights leader and academic
 Thomas B. Turley, US Senator
 Alfred Jefferson Vaughan, Jr., Confederate army general
 Gideon Pillow, Confederate General

Visiting Elmwood

The cemetery grounds are open from 8:00 am to 4:30 pm CST, seven days a week, including holidays. The cemetery office is open Monday through Friday from 8:00 am to 4:30 pm CST, Saturday from 8:00 am to 12:00 pm CST, and is closed on Sundays and holidays.

References

External links
 
 Photo Tour of Elmwood Cemetery
 
 

Cemeteries in Tennessee
Geography of Memphis, Tennessee
1852 establishments in Tennessee
Cemeteries on the National Register of Historic Places in Tennessee
Tourist attractions in Memphis, Tennessee
Protected areas of Shelby County, Tennessee
National Register of Historic Places in Memphis, Tennessee
Rural cemeteries
Yellow fever monuments and memorials